

The following lists events that happened during 1978 in Afghanistan.

Incumbents
 General Secretary of the People's Democratic Party of Afghanistan: 
 Nur Muhammad Taraki
 President: 
 until 27 April: Mohammed Daoud Khan
 Chairman of the Revolutionary Council:
 27 April-30 April: Abdul Qadir
 starting 30 April: Nur Muhammad Taraki
 Chairman of the Council of Ministers: 
 Nur Muhammad Taraki (starting 1 May)

April 27, 1978
A bloody coup devised  Hafizullah Amin, a U.S.-educated Khalq leader who, before his impending arrest, contacted party members in the armed forces - the PDPA overthrows Daud Khan's government. Daud Khan and most of his family are killed. Daud dies in Kabul together with the country's vice-president, leading ministers, and the commander of the armed forces, all of whom reportedly tried to resist the takeover. The fighting continues into the following day. On April 30 a Revolutionary Council headed by Taraki assumes control of the government. Amin becomes Foreign Minister. The country is renamed the Democratic Republic of Afghanistan. Although Taraki professes a non-aligned policy, there are signs that he is leaning heavily on the Soviet Union for economic aid and advice.

June 1978
Taraki attempts to purge the ruling PDPA of prominent leaders of the Parcham wing of the party. Some are sent abroad as ambassadors, including Deputy Prime Minister Babrak Karmal, who is appointed ambassador to Czechoslovakia.

July 1978
Taraki's reform program - which threatened to undermine basic Afghan cultural patterns - and political repression having antagonized large segments of the population, the first major uprising occurs in Nurestan. Other revolts, largely uncoordinated, spread throughout all of Afghanistan's provinces, and periodic explosions rock Kabul and other major cities.

August 17, 1978
It is announced that the Defense Minister, Gen. Abdul Qadir, one of the coup leaders, has been arrested after the discovery of an alleged plot to overthrow the government. Qadir also belonged to the Parcham faction.

December 5, 1978
After two days of talks in Moscow, Taraki and Brezhnev sign a treaty called the Soviet-Afghan Friendship treaty, which commits their countries to a 20-year treaty of friendship and cooperation.  Among other things, both nations pledge to continue "to develop cooperation in the military field on the basis of appropriate agreements." Article 4 of the treaty justified Soviet intervention in the case of outside armed invasion, and this article was used by Soviets in 1979 to justify their invasion of the country. Taraki says Afghanistan will remain officially non-aligned. However, most political observers believe that Taraki's favourable view of Marxism signifies much more than a mere continuation of Afghanistan's traditional economic ties with its powerful Soviet neighbour to the north.

 
Afghanistan
Years of the 20th century in Afghanistan
Afghanistan
1970s in Afghanistan